Karen Engleman (born February 15, 1953) is an American politician who has served in the Indiana House of Representatives from the 70th district since 2016.

Abortion 
Engleman believes abortion should be made illegal in nearly all circumstances, even in cases of rape, incest, or the health of the mother.  In July 2022, she attempted to pass legislation that would have prevented a 10-year-old incest victim from getting an abortion.

References

1953 births
Living people
21st-century American politicians
21st-century American women politicians
Republican Party members of the Indiana House of Representatives
Women state legislators in Indiana